The 2004 United States rugby union tour was a series of matches played in Ireland and Italy 2004 in  by United States national rugby union team.

Results

Ireland: 15.Geordan Murphy, 14.Shane Horgan, 13.Brian O'Driscoll  (capt.), 12.Kevin Maggs, 11.Tommy Bowe, 10.David Humphreys, 9.Guy Easterby, 8.Eric Miller, 7.Denis Leamy, 6.Simon Easterby, 5.Paul O'Connell, 4.Donncha O'Callaghan, 3.John Hayes, 2.Frank Sheahan, 1.Marcus Horan,  - replacements: 17.Simon Best, 18.Leo Cullen, 19.Anthony Foley, 20.Peter Stringer, 20.Peter Stringer, 22.Girvan Dempsey    -  No entry : 16.Shane Byrne, 21.Ronan O'Gara
United States: 15.Francois Viljoen, 14.Al Lakomskis, 13.Paul Emerick, 12.Salesi Sika, 11.David Fee, 10.Mike Hercus, 9.Mose Timoteo, 8.Kort Schubert (capt.), 7.Tony Petruzzella, 6.Brian Surgener, 5.Gerhard Klerck, 4.Alec Parker, 3.Jacob Waasdorp, 2.Matt Wyatt, 1.Mike MacDonald,  - replacements: 19.Tasi Mo'unga, 20.David Williams, 22.Albert Tuipulotu       -  No entry: 16.Mike Hobson, 17.Chris Osentowski, 18.Jurie Gouws, 21.Matt Sherman

Italy: 15.Roland de Marigny, 14.Kaine Robertson, 13.Walter Pozzebon, 12.Cristian Stoica, 11.Ludovico Nitoglia, 10.Luciano Orquera, 9.Paul Griffen, 8.David dal Maso, 7.Silvio Orlando, 6.Enrico Pavanello, 5.Valerio Bernabò, 4.Cristian Bezzi, 3.Salvatore Perugini, 2.Fabio Ongaro (capt.), 1.Andrea Lo Cicero,  - replacements: 17.Salvatore Costanzo, 18.Roberto Mandelli, 19.Antonio Mannato, 21.Andrea Scanavacca, 22.Matteo Barbini     -  No entry : 16.Giorgio Intoppa, 20.Pietro Travagli
United States: 15.Francois Viljoen, 14.Al Lakomskis, 13.Paul Emerick, 12.Salesi Sika, 11.David Fee, 10.Mike Hercus, 9.Mose Timoteo, 8.Kort Schubert (capt.), 7.Brian Surgener, 6.Jurie Gouws, 5.Gerhard Klerck, 4.Alec Parker, 3.Jacob Waasdorp, 2.Matt Wyatt, 1.Mike MacDonald,  - replacements: 17.Chris Osentowski, 19.Tasi Mo'unga, 20.David Williams, 22.Albert Tuipulotu      -  No entry: 16.Mike Hobson, 18.Matt Kane, 21.Matt Sherman

References
 
 "

United States
tour
United States national rugby union team tours
tour
tour